Microbacterium thalassium  is a bacterium from the genus of Microbacterium which has been isolated from the rhizosphere from mangrove trees on Japan.

References

Further reading 
 

Bacteria described in 1998
thalassium